Orthocephalus saltator is a Palearctic species of plant bug in the family Miridae. It is found in Europe as far as the Caspian Sea and Siberia and to the south North Africa.
O. saltator feeds on Asteraceae especially Hieracium pilosella and Poaceae

References

Further reading

External links
Orthocephalus saltator images at  Consortium for the Barcode of Life

Orthotylinae
Articles created by Qbugbot
Insects described in 1835
Taxa named by Carl Wilhelm Hahn